General elections were held in Liechtenstein in July and August 1910.

Electors 
Electors were selected through elections that were held between 23 and 28 July. Each municipality had two electors for every 100 inhabitants.

Results 
The election of Oberland's Landtag members and substitutes was held on 2 August in Vaduz. Of Oberland's 122 electors, 117 were present. Oberland elected seven Landtag members and three substitutes.

The election of Unterland's Landtag members and substitutes was held on 4 August in Mauren. Of Unterland's 70 electors, 69 were present. Unterland elected five Landtag members and two substitute.

Franz Schlegel did not accept his election as a Landtag member for Oberland and was replaced by Josef Gassner.

References 

Liechtenstein
1910 in Liechtenstein
Elections in Liechtenstein
August 1910 events